Events from the year 1535 in art.

Events

Works

 Albrecht Altdorfer – The Fall of Man
 Chen Chun – Mountains in Clouds
 Hans Baldung Grien – The Seven Ages of Woman
 Hans Holbein the Younger – Charles de Solier, comte de Morette
 Jan Mostaert – Landscape with an Episode from the Conquest of America ("West Indies Landscape", approximate date)
 Parmigianino (some dates approximate)
 Cupid Making His Arch
 Madonna of the Long Neck
 The Virgin and Child with St Mary Magdalen and the Infant John the Baptist
 Pontormo – Portrait of Alessandro de' Medici
 Francesco de' Rossi (Il Salviati) – Annunciation (fresco in San Francesco a Ripa, Rome, adcompleted)

Births
 Alessandro Allori, Italian portrait painter of the late Mannerist Florentine school (died 1607)
 Giovanni Antonio di Amato the younger, Italian painter (died 1598)
 Biagio Betti, Italian painter (died 1605)
 Leonhard Baumhauer, German sculptor (died 1604)
 Bernaert de Rijckere, Flemish painter (died 1590)
 Germain Pilon, French sculptors of the French Renaissance (died 1590)
 Felipe Guaman Poma de Ayala, Quechua noble man known for illustrating a chronicle of the native peoples of the Andes (died 1616)
 Pieter van der Borcht (I), Flemish Renaissance painter and etcher (died 1608)

Deaths
 Zhou Chen, Chinese painter in middle Ming Dynasty (born 1460)
 Kamāl ud-Dīn Behzād, painter of Persian miniatures  (born 1450)
 Angelos Pitzamanos, Greek Renaissance painter (born 1467)
 Cristofano Robetta, Italian engraver (born 1462)
 Antonio de Saliba - Italian painter (born 1466)
 Jan Rombouts the Elder - Flemish Renaissance painter, glass painter, draftsman, printmaker and glass designer (born 1480)

 
Years of the 16th century in art